Ophiusa tettensis  is a moth of the family Erebidae. It is found in Africa, including Mozambique, South Africa and the Congo.

A known foodplant of this species is Combretum indicum (a Combretaceae).

References

Ophiusa
Moths of Africa
Moths described in 1858